Aleksandar Radosavljević (Serbian Cyrillic: Александар Радосављевић; born 21 December 1982) is a Serbian former professional footballer who played as a goalkeeper.

Career
Radosavljević started out at Čukarički, playing six years with the club.

He moved to Partizan in June 2007, agreeing to a four-year deal. As the third-string keeper behind Darko Božović and starter Mladen Božović, Radosavljević saw limited action. He briefly got a chance as first-string keeper under head coach Goran Stevanović between late September and early November 2009 (including three Europa League matches against Shakhtar Donetsk and Club Brugge), after which Mladen Božović again became Partizan's undisputed first-choice goalkeeper. Radosavljević spent three seasons with Partizan and won five trophies, before being released by mutual consent in August 2010 after qualifying with the team for the 2010–11 Champions League.

Shortly after, Radosavljević moved abroad and signed with Hungarian club Győr, staying there until the end of the 2010–11 season. In 2012, he signed a one-year contract with the Serbian White Eagles in the Canadian Soccer League but did not feature in any games.

Honours
Partizan
 Serbian SuperLiga: 2007–08, 2008–09, 2009–10
 Serbian Cup: 2007–08, 2008–09

References

External links

 

1982 births
Living people
Sportspeople from Kraljevo
Association football goalkeepers
Expatriate footballers in Hungary
FK Čukarički players
FK Partizan players
Győri ETO FC players
Serbian White Eagles FC players
Canadian Soccer League (1998–present) players
Nemzeti Bajnokság I players
Serbian expatriate footballers
Serbian expatriate sportspeople in Hungary
Serbian First League players
Serbian footballers
Serbian SuperLiga players